Iowa 80 is the world's largest truck stop, located along Interstate 80 off exit 284 in Walcott, Iowa. It sits on a  plot of land, three times larger than an average  truckstop, and it receives 5,000 visitors daily. Iowa 80 features a  main building, parking for 900 trucks, 15 diesel fuel pumps, and also has a dedicated pump for dispensing bulk diesel exhaust fluid. Four-hundred and fifty employees staff the megaplex.

Iowa 80 is currently affiliated with the TravelCenters of America chain.

History
Bill Moon, a regional manager for Standard Oil, purchased the land and built the original truckstop in 1964 along the emerging I-80, the  highway that would directly connect San Francisco with New York.  "As they were building I-80, my father was responsible for finding land and building truck stops for Standard," says his daughter Delia Meier. Initially a small white enamel building surrounded by cornfields, it housed a modest truckers' store, one lube bay and a restaurant. Bill Moon took direct control in September 1965 and eventually purchased the site from the corporation in 1984. In 1992, the year of Moon's death, it became a Travelcenter of America franchise, though the facility is still owned and operated by the Moon family. In addition, the Iowa 80 Group also owns the Joplin Petro on Interstate 44, Oak Grove 70 Petro off Interstate 70 just outside Kansas City, and Kenly 95 off of Interstate 95.

Facilities

Exterior
Iowa 80 has a large truck parking lot, truck scales, and fueling stations as is customary for a truck stop.
There are fifteen fuel stations.  The stations have nozzles on each side, so tanks on both sides of the truck can be filled simultaneously.  Since the introduction of trucks requiring diesel exhaust fluid, the fuel island at Iowa 80 has been renovated to include pumps for bulk DEF dispensing. Iowa 80 has a service center where vehicle diagnostics, minor repairs, oil changes or tire rotations can be done. A small convenience store is located on the fuel island.  Iowa 80 also has a truck washing facility, and even the engine can be washed.

CAT scales
CAT (Certified Automated Truck) scale was founded by Iowa 80 owner Bill Moon. With over 2,000 locations in the United States and Canada, CAT is now touted as the largest scale company network in the world. An innovative app (weigh my truck) allows those weighing to not only get the information on a device in their vehicle but also pay for it.

Interior

Trucker's Warehouse Store

The Iowa 80 facility also has a two-story,  showroom, which is the largest trucker's store in the country. Here customers may purchase chrome accessories, books, DVDs, CDs, cell phone accessories, CB radio equipment, apparel and cleaners, chrome stacks, and bumpers.  There are custom built show trucks, one on a rotating platform. A  wall displays 500 illuminated truck lights.  Also located in the store are a vinyl graphics shop, a custom T-shirt shop, and an  embroidery center.

Food services

A number of food services are located at the stop. These include 
Blimpie, Wendy's, Caribou Coffee, Dairy Queen, Orange Julius, Taco Bell, Einstein Bros. Bagels, and Pizza Hut. The Iowa 80 Kitchen has an extensive salad bar and provides 'home-cooked' meals.  The Iowa 80 Kitchen serves 1 million cups of coffee and 90 tons of meat annually.  The restaurant seats 350 patrons, and a banquet room expands the total capacity by 60.

Other facilities

There are twenty-four private shower and toilet rooms (which may be requested at the fuel pump), a game room, and a Driver's Den Lounge.  The lounge provides leather chairs and a fireplace for relaxing.  Iowa 80 also features a business center with fax machines, logbooks & trip report forms and working stations, along with a small free gym.  A 60-seat movie theater and an on-site barbershop are available.

Facilities also include a dentist's office and a chiropractic clinic. The dentist usually arrives at around 9am; some of his patrons are local residents rather than truckers.  In the Modern Marvels episode "Truck Stops" on the History Channel, the dentist states that he is sometimes the "truckers best friend" because he is providing treatment that is usually aimed at "taking them (the drivers) out of pain".  According to the dentist interviewed for the episode, the dentist office in Iowa 80 is very beneficial because it provides a service to patients that might not otherwise get to visit a dentist due to the nomadic lifestyle that over-the-road truck drivers lead.  The dentist's office in Iowa 80 accepts both private pay and most all of the major dental insurance plans offered to drivers by companies, making its services accessible to a much wider range of clients.

Across the hall from the dentist is a recently added chiropractic clinic. Services include chiropractic adjustments and Department of Transportation physicals.

Gallery

References

External links 

 

Buildings and structures in Scott County, Iowa
Transportation in Iowa
Landmarks in Iowa
Restaurants in Iowa
Standard Oil
Tourist attractions in Scott County, Iowa
American companies established in 1964
Retail companies established in 1964
Restaurants established in 1964
Truck stop chains
Gas stations in the United States
1964 establishments in Iowa